The 2012 World Mixed Doubles Curling Championship was held at the Milli Piyango Curling Arena in Erzurum, Turkey from April 23 to 29. Erzurum previously hosted the 2011 Winter Universiade, during which the Milli Piyango Curling Arena was used for the curling competition. Among the previous hosts of the World Mixed Doubles Curling Championships, Turkey is the nation with the least experience in curling; its curling federation joined the World Curling Federation in 2009. For the first time since 2009, the event was not held in conjunction with the same year's World Senior Championships.

Switzerland won its fourth title in five years, defeating Sweden in the final with a score of 7–6. Austria won its first medal at the World Mixed Doubles Championship with a 12–7 win in the bronze medal game over the United States, which had its best finish at the event.

Teams
The teams are listed as follows:

Round-robin standings
Final round-robin standings

Round-robin results
All times listed in Eastern European Summer Time (UTC+3).

Blue Group

Tuesday, April 24
Draw 2
8:00

Draw 4
14:30

Draw 5
17:45

Wednesday, April 25
Draw 7
8:00

Draw 9
14:30

Draw 10
17:45

Draw 11
21:00

Thursday, April 26
Draw 12
8:00

Draw 13
11:15

Draw 14
14:30

Draw 15
17:45

Draw 16
21:00

Friday, April 27
Draw 17
8:00

Draw 18
11:15

Draw 19
14:30

Draw 20
17:45

Draw 21
21:00

Saturday, April 28
Draw 23
11:15

Red Group

Monday, April 23
Draw 1
18:45

Tuesday, April 24
Draw 3
11:15

Draw 5
17:45

Draw 6
21:00

Wednesday, April 25
Draw 8
11:15

Draw 10
17:45

Thursday, April 26
Draw 12
8:00

Draw 13
11:15

Draw 14
14:30

Draw 15
17:45

Draw 16
21:00

Friday, April 27
Draw 18
11:15

Draw 20
17:45

Saturday, April 28
Draw 22
8:00

Yellow Group

Monday, April 23
Draw 1
18:45

Tuesday, April 24
Draw 2
8:00

Draw 3
11:15

Draw 4
14:30

Draw 5
17:45

Draw 6
21:00

Wednesday, April 25
Draw 7
8:00

Draw 8
11:15

Draw 9
14:30

Draw 11
21:00

Thursday, April 26
Draw 12
8:00

Draw 13
11:15

Draw 14
14:30

Draw 15
17:45

Draw 16
21:00

Friday, April 27
Draw 17
8:00

Draw 18
11:15

Draw 19
14:30

Draw 20
17:45

Draw 21
21:00

Saturday, April 28
Draw 22
8:00

Draw 23
11:15

Tiebreaker
Saturday, April 28, 18:30

Playoffs

Qualification Game
Saturday, April 28, 18:30

Quarterfinals
Sunday, April 29, 8:00

Semifinals
Sunday, April 29, 12:00

Bronze medal game
Sunday, April 29, 16:00

Gold medal game
Sunday, April 29, 16:00

References
General

Specific

World Mixed Doubles Curling Championship, 2012
World Mixed Doubles Curling Championship
2012 in Turkish sport
International curling competitions hosted by Turkey
Sport in Erzurum